Marella Discovery (formerly Splendour of the Seas and TUI Discovery) is a former Royal Caribbean International Vision-class cruise ship now sailing for Marella Cruises. The second in the line of the Vision-class ships, she features a seven-story lobby, rock-climbing wall, and a 9-hole miniature golf course.

Following the announcement on 9 October 2017 that Thomson Cruises would be renamed Marella Cruises, TUI Group also announced that TUI Discovery would adopt the name Marella Discovery at the end of October 2017, and also that she would become the first ship in the Thomson fleet to be based in Asia, home porting Malaysia in Autumn 2018, following the end of her UK debut season.

History
Marella Discovery was built for Royal Caribbean International as Splendour of the Seas by Chantiers de l'Atlantique at their shipyard in Saint-Nazaire, France. The ship was assigned the yard number "B31", and was launched on 17 June 1995 by Lisa Wilhelmsen. The ship is registered to the port of Nassau, in the Bahamas. Maiden voyage for Splendour of the Seas commenced on 31 March 1996.

On 31 October 2011, Royal Caribbean and Spanish shipyard Navantia signed a contract for Splendour of the Seas to receive structural modifications, maintenance to the propellers, propeller shafts and rudder, and interior upgrades, including new dining and public areas, 124 new balconies, and improvements to staterooms. The work was expected to take about five weeks to complete.

Until April 2016, Splendour of the Seas was based in Brazil during the southern hemisphere summer, doing a series of itineraries from three to twelve nights throughout South America, and is based out of Venice, Italy during the northern hemisphere summer, sailing seven night cruises to the Eastern Mediterranean.

In March 2015, Royal Caribbean sold Splendour of the Seas to TUI Cruises who was then sub-chartered to Thomson Cruises, with the final sailing for Royal Caribbean departing on 4 April 2016.  The ship was renamed TUI Discovery and was based in Palma, Mallorca and Bridgetown, Barbados starting in June 2016 after refurbishment. She was originally going to be renamed Thomson Discovery, but the name was changed to TUI Discovery as part of their rebranding.

On 22 October 2015 whilst sailing on a cruise in the Mediterranean, Splendour of the Seas suffered an engine-room fire, which was extinguished after 2 hours by the crew. There were no injuries reported by Royal Caribbean and the ship continued its journey to the port of Venice.

Splendour of the Seas spent her last season with Royal Caribbean International by sailing from Dubai on 7-8 night cruises, visiting destinations such as Muscat, Oman and Abu Dhabi throughout November 2015 - March 2016.

Design
The propulsion system consists of five Wärtsilä Vasa 12V46B engines, which supply  each to the ship's two,  diameter, fixed pitch propellers. Main propulsion is supplemented by two  bow thrusters and a  stern thruster.

Facilities and layout
The ship has eleven passenger accessible decks, with passenger accommodation located on decks 2 to 3 and 6 to 8. Up to 2,074 passengers can be carried, in 902 cabins. Most of the outdoor public facilities are on decks 9 and 10. Indoor passenger facilities include a theater, casino, and a main dining room.

The standard crew complement is 720, with accommodation for another 30 if required; most crew accommodation is located near the bottom of the ship, on deck 0 and 1. The bridge is located forward on deck 8. Onboard equipment can generate  of fresh water every day,  of which will be used aboard during the same period.

Gallery

References

External links

 Royal Caribbean official information about Splendour of the Seas

Ships of Royal Caribbean International
Ships built in France
1995 ships